The women's 4 × 400 metres relay competition of the athletics events at the 2019 Pan American Games will take place on the 10 of August at the 2019 Pan American Games Athletics Stadium. The defending Pan American Games champion is United States.

Summary
With all 9 lanes filled, USA's Lynna Irby took off from the gun, making up the stagger on Chile's Martina Weil-Restrepo.  Though looking impressive, she paid for the early speed by tying up on the home stretch, Jamaica's Olympic relay silver medalist Stephanie Ann McPherson putting her team in a clear lead ahead of Cuba and Canada.  As Canada's Aiyanna Stiverne took the break, with Cuba's Rose Mary Almanza Blanco looking for running room, USA's Jaide Stepter calmly worked her way behind them.  Coming off the turn she cruised by into second place handing off to 400 hurdle silver medalist Anna Cockrell.  Down the backstretch, Cockrell opened up 5 metres on Canada's Kyra Constantine, but through the second turn, Constantine pulled that back in, then pounced to zoom past not only Cockrell but Jamaica's 800 meter champion Natoya Goule.  The medals were decided for the anchor leg with Canada's 400 meter champion Sage Watson a step ahead of Jamaica's Roniesha McGregor a step ahead of USA's Courtney Okolo.  Cuba was more than 20 metres back.  The gap tightened through the final turn as McGregor closed on Watson and Okolo closed on McGregor, moving to her outer shoulder then pouncing, sprinting away from Watson and McGregor for the USA win by 3 metres.  Watson separated from McGregor by the same 3 metres for a Canadian silver.

Records
Prior to this competition, the existing world and Pan American Games records were as follows:

Schedule

Results
All times shown are in seconds.

Final
The results were as follows:

References

Athletics at the 2019 Pan American Games
2019